Demos Christou (Greek: Δήμος Χρήστου) (born 1937) is a Cypriot archaeologist and Director of the Department of Antiquities from 1991 to 1997. He was born in the village of Galini. He studied history and archaeology in the National and Kapodistrian University of Athens, and continued his studies in the UCL Institute of Archaeology and the École du Louvre. In 1997 he earned his doctoral degree from the National and Kapodistrian University of Athens with a dissertation on the funerary architecture of Cypriot tombs. He conducted extensive excavations at Kourion between 1975 and 1998.

Publications 
 Christou, D. (1985). Anavargos, archaeological site. Great Cypriot Encyclopedia, 2, 133-134.
 Christou, D. (1994). Kourion: a complete guide to its monuments and local museum. Filokipros Publications.
 Christou, D. (1996). Chronique des fouilles et découvertes archéohgiques à Chypre en 1995. Bulletin de Correspondance Hellénique, 120(2), 1051-1100.
 Χρήστου, Δ. (1996). Κυπρο-Αρχαϊκή Μνημειακή Ταφική Αρχιτεκτονική. Λευκωσία: Τμήμα Αρχαιοτήτων, Κύπρου.
 Χρήστου, Δ. (2013). Ανασκαφές Κουρίου 1975-1998. Τόμοι Α-Β. Nicosia: Department of Antiquities, Cyprus.

References 

Cypriot archaeologists
Greek Cypriot people
1937 births
Living people

20th-century archaeologists
21st-century archaeologists
People from Nicosia District
National and Kapodistrian University of Athens alumni